Torpedo Alley, also known as Down Periscope, is a 1952 American war film directed by Lew Landers and starring Mark Stevens, Dorothy Malone and Charles Winninger. It depicts a US Navy pilot rescued at sea by submarine before applying for submarine duty.

Plot
When an American transport plane crashed, only the pilot, Lieutenant Bob Bingham, survived. Now he is drifting out to sea as a “shipwrecked man”. Fortunately for him, he is fished up by the crew of a submarine. Bingham's concern that he might be guilty of the deaths of his two comrades does not leave him in peace. After a while he decided to start a new professional life in the Navy. His goal is to become the commander of a submarine. At the training area he meets Commander Heywood and First Engineer Gates again, who saved him on the high seas. Bingham soon became friends with the nurse Susan Peabody.

In June 1950 the Korean War breaks out. In this, the United States supports the troops of South Korea. Heywood and Gates take command of a submarine. The crew also includes Bingham and his new friend Graham. As part of a special task force, Bingham and Gates are assigned to blow up a bridge. In the process of execution, two men are killed; Gates and Bingham are badly wounded. But the strategically important bridge could be destroyed.

Susan is a nurse on the hospital ship that recovered the two injured. Bingham realizes that she is very concerned about his health. Now he is convinced that not only does he love her, but she also loves him.

Cast
 Mark Stevens as Lt. Bob Bingham
 Dorothy Malone as Lt. Susan Peabody
 Charles Winninger as Oliver J. Peabody
 Bill Williams as Lt. Tom Graham
 Douglas Kennedy as Lt. Dora Gates
 James Millican as Cmdr. Heywood
 William Henry as Instructor
 James Seay as Skipper
 Bob Rose as Anniston
 John Alvin as Professor
 Carleton Young as Psychiatrist
 Ralph Sanford as Charles Hedley
 Jean Willes as Peggy Moran

See also
 Submarine films

References

External links

1952 films
Films about submarine warfare
World War II submarine films
1950s war drama films
American war drama films
Films directed by Lew Landers
Allied Artists films
1952 drama films
American black-and-white films
1950s English-language films
1950s American films